was a village located in Saeki District, Hiroshima Prefecture, Japan.

On March 1, 2003, Yoshiwa, along with the town of Saeki (also from Saeki District), was merged into the expanded city of Hatsukaichi.

Dissolved municipalities of Hiroshima Prefecture
Hatsukaichi, Hiroshima